Sevastopuloa is a monotypic moth genus in the subfamily Lymantriinae. Its only species, Sevastopuloa celaenocera, is found in Kenya. Both the genus and the species were first described by Cyril Leslie Collenette in 1960.

References

Lymantriinae
Monotypic moth genera